The Siam Rath Weekly Review was an English-language weekly newspaper whose first issue was published in Thailand on 10 July 1952. The contents of Siam Rath Weekly Review were mainly the translations of feature materials and editorials from the Thai-language newspapers, especially the daily Siam Rath, also owned by M.R. Kukrit.

See also 
Timeline of English-language newspapers published in Thailand
List of online newspaper archives - Thailand

References 

Defunct newspapers published in Thailand
English-language newspapers published in Asia
Mass media in Bangkok
English-language newspapers published in Thailand